Gavmishabad (also Romanized as Gāvmīshābād; also known as Golshan) was a village in Kut-e Abdollah Rural District, in the Central District of Karun County, Khuzestan Province, Iran. At the 2006 census, its population was 3,976, in 600 families. The village was merged with 8 other into one city called Kut-e Abdollah.

References 

Former populated places in Karun County